Palaemon guangdongensis is a shrimp species in the family Palaemonidae.

References

Palaemonidae
Crustaceans described in 1990